Rhyacoschistura suber is a species of ray-finned fish, a stone loach, in the genus Rhyacoschistura.  This species was originally described from three specimens collected among leaf litter in very shallow water in a small forest creek in the Nam Leuk drainage basin in Laos in 1997. These specimens were revealed to be juveniles and the species was re-described in 2019 on the basis of adult specimens. Based on the re-description, the species was moved from Schistura to the newly described genus, Rhyacoschistura.

References

Nemacheilidae
Taxa named by Maurice Kottelat
Fish described in 2000